Lake Henry may refer to:

Cities, towns, townships etc.
Lake Henry, Minnesota, a small city in Stearns County
Lake Henry Township, Stearns County, Minnesota

Lakes

Lake Henry (Florida), located in Highlands County, Florida
Lake Henry (Polk County, Florida), northeast of Winter Haven, Florida
Lake Henry (Douglas County, Minnesota)
Lake Henry (Le Sueur County, Minnesota)
Lake Henry, a lake in Kingsbury County, South Dakota, near De Smet
Lake Henry (Nova Scotia)
Lake Henry (Bon Homme County, South Dakota)
Lake Henry (Codington County, South Dakota)
Lake Henry (Kingsbury County, South Dakota)
 Lake Henry (New Zealand)

See also

Henry Lake (disambiguation)